Adam Kopas (born 16 August 1999) is a Slovak professional footballer who currently plays for Fortuna Liga club Žilina as a midfielder.

Club career

MŠK Žilina
Kopas made his Fortuna Liga debut for Žilina against ViOn Zlaté Moravce on 2 March 2019. He played at pod Dubňom for 76 minutes before being replaced by Filip Balaj, who scored the winning goal 6 minutes later, to get Žilina the 2:1 victory.

International career
Kopas was first recognised in a senior national team nomination on 16 March 2022 by Štefan Tarkovič as an alternate ahead of two international friendly fixtures against Norway and Finland. He did not penetrate into the shortlisted nomination by the end of the year, even under new manager Francesco Calzona, being omitted from nomination for September 2022–23 UEFA Nations League C fixtures and only being listed as an alternate for two November friendlies and prospective national team players' training camp in December.

References

External links
 MŠK Žilina official club profile 
 
 Futbalnet profile 
 

1999 births
Living people
Sportspeople from Žilina
Slovak footballers
Slovakia youth international footballers
Association football midfielders
MŠK Žilina players
2. Liga (Slovakia) players
Slovak Super Liga players